Rabia Sport Club, is an Iraqi football team based in Tel Afar District, Nineveh, that plays in the Iraq Division Two.

See also 

 2020–21 Iraq FA Cup
 Iraq Division Two

References 

1994 establishments in Iraq
Football clubs in Nineveh